San Miguel is a department in the eastern part of El Salvador. The capital is San Miguel. The department is 2,077 km2 in area and has a population of over 678,000.

Before the Spanish conquest of El Salvador, the territory that now consists of the departments of San Miguel, La Unión and Morazán was the Lenca kingdom of Chaparrastique (Place of Beautiful Orchids).

San Miguel was first known as San Miguel de la Frontera. The city was founded by Luis de Moscoso on May 8, 1530, where it is now Santa Elena. On July 11, 1812, the city was given the title of "Noble y Leal Ciudad" (noble and loyal city). It was made a department on June 12, 1824.

It is the location of Ciudad Barrios, the birthplace of  Archbishop Óscar Romero.

Municipalities

 Carolina
 Chapeltique
 Chinameca
 Chirilagua
 Ciudad Barrios
 Comacarán
 El Tránsito
 Lolotique
 Moncagua
 Nueva Guadalupe
 Nuevo Edén de San Juan
 Quelepa
 San Antonio
 San Gerardo
 San Jorge
 San Luis de la Reina
 San Miguel
 San Rafael
 Sesori
 Uluazapa

Agriculture

The products that are more cultivated are the basic grains, henequen and sugar cane, fruits, oleaginous seeds, mangrove, and grass. The upbringing of bovine, swinish, goat, and mule livestock exists and the upbringing of corral birds and of bees. Among the most important manufacturing, there is the elaboration of nutritious products, threads, yarns, drinks, cotton fabrics, clothes, leather articles, detergents, soaps, milk, and construction material.

Tourism
There are a few beaches in the San Miguel department, such as El Cuco.

References

El Salvador at GeoHive

 
Departments of El Salvador
States and territories established in 1824